James Robert Hanson (born 9 November 1987) is an English professional footballer who plays as a striker for Worksop Town. He also coaches at the RIASA Academy.

After playing youth football for Huddersfield Town and Bradford City, Hanson began his career in semi-professional non-league football, playing for Eccleshill United and Guiseley. He turned professional after re-signing with Bradford City in 2009, for whom he made over 300 appearances. He later played for Sheffield United, Bury, AFC Wimbledon, Grimsby Town, Farsley Celtic and Boston United.

Playing career

Early career
Born in Bradford, West Yorkshire, Hanson played youth football for Huddersfield Town (where he was let go at the age of 15 for being too small), as well as Bradford City. He began his senior career playing semi-professional non-league football with Eccleshill United and Guiseley, balancing his football career with a job in a local Co-operative supermarket in Idle, Bradford. Bradford City fans later sang a song about Hanson's supermarket work.

Bradford City

2009–10 season
Hanson signed his first professional contract with Bradford City in July 2009, with his transfer fee set by a tribunal hearing six months later at a figure close to £7,500, a sell-on clause and the agreement of a friendly between the two sides. Hanson made his debut for Bradford on the opening day of the 2009–10 season, on 8 August 2009, in a 5–0 defeat against Notts County. Hanson scored his first goal for Bradford on 22 August 2009, in a 5–4 victory away at Cheltenham Town. Hanson won the Player of the Year award during his first season at Bradford City, and was rewarded with a new, improved contract for the next four years.

2011–12 season
In February 2012, Hanson suffered a groin injury, and was estimated to miss six weeks of matches. During the 2011–12 season, Hanson scored 14 goals, his highest tally to date in three years as a professional.

2012–13 season

In October 2012, teammate Andrew Davies stated his belief that Hanson's goals would help the club achieve promotion. He scored Bradford City's goal in the second leg League Cup semi-final tie against Aston Villa, and was named Man Of The Match for the second leg, helping Bradford to the League Cup final. Hanson had a broken toe prior to the match, and received an injection for it 15 minutes before kick-off. Hanson's performance was praised by former manager Steve Kittrick.

Hanson played in the 2013 Football League Cup Final; after the match, he said he believed Bradford City would return to Wembley via the League Two play-offs. Hanson scored two goals in the next three League matches, reaching 10 goals for the season, and later that month he stated that the club had to win both forthcoming Easter games. In April 2013, Hanson spoke of the "buzz" around the club as they mounted a play-off challenge. On 5 May, he scored a vital goal in the second leg of the play-off semi-final against Burton Albion, helping Bradford overcome a 3–2 deficit from the home leg to win the game 3–1 and the tie 5–4 on aggregate. In the Final at Wembley, Hanson scored in a 3–0 victory against Northampton Town, and later spoke about how he was looking forward to playing in a higher division.

2013–14 season
Ahead of the 2013–14 season, Bradford City manager Phil Parkinson said that only a high-money bid would persuade the club to sell either Hanson and fellow striker Nahki Wells. In July 2013, Hanson was praised by former Bradford City left-back Wayne Jacobs, and in August 2013 Hanson spoke positively of his partnership with teammate Nahki Wells. Wells has also publicly praised his strike partnership with Hanson, as has journalist Simon Parker, who described them as "[one of] the best front pairs that League One has to offer." Hanson has also been praised by manager Phil Parkinson. In October 2013 Hanson spoke about his use of a mind coach. On 29 November 2013 he signed a new contract with the club, taking him up to the end of the 2016–17 season, and becoming the first player at the club to sign a new contract that season. In December 2013 fellow Bradford City player Andrew Davies described Wells and Hanson as the best strike pair in the division. The partnership ended when Wells was sold to Huddersfield Town in January 2014. In February 2014, after Hanson scored his 10th goal of the season, Davies spoke about Hanson's increase in playing form. In March 2014, Hanson spoke about new strike partner Aaron McLean's lack of goals for the club, while Hanson himself had scored 6 goals in 9 games. That same month Hanson was revealed as the player in 3 divisions of the Football League who had committed the most fouls in the 2013–14 season to date; he was defended by manager Phil Parkinson. Throughout March and April, Hanson suffered a number of minor injuries which prevented him from playing, making only 1 appearance in the past 7 games as of 25 April 2014. His work-rate during that season was later praised by former teammate Andy Gray.

2014–15 season
Ahead of the 2014–15 season the club implemented new a playing style and match tactics, and Hanson stated he was looking forward to showing that he was able to adapt to it. In August 2014, after scoring five goals in the season to date, Hanson entered the club's top ten all-time scorer list. In September 2014 it was announced that Hanson was suffering from a thigh injury, and could miss up to 5 matches. In December 2014, following his return from injury, Hanson was kept out of the starting line-up by Jon Stead and Billy Clarke. In January 2015 Hanson praised Stead, while later that month he was himself praised by ex-Bantam striker Dean Windass. Following Bradford City's shock victory in the FA Cup over Chelsea, Hanson was praised by their captain John Terry. Hanson later described the Chelsea match as his favourite game for Bradford City.

In April 2015 Hanson declared that he was aiming to score 20 goals a season for the club; at that point he was on 11 goals, having not scored for two months. In May 2015 the club rejected an undisclosed transfer bid for Hanson from Millwall. Despite the rejection, Millwall stated they were still interested in signing Hanson, and Bradford City turned down a second bid a few weeks later. Bradford City delayed any possible transfer while they searched for a replacement, although Hanson later stated he wished to remain at the club. Hanson credited manager Phil Parkinson with persuading him to stay at the club.

2015–16 season
At the start of the 2015–16 season, Hanson discussed his striker partnership with new summer signing Devante Cole. He was dropped from the starting XI in October 2015, following a poor performance in a previous game, having played every game up to that point of the season. After an injury to his replacement Steve Davies, Hanson returned to the first-team later that month, scoring in his first game back in the starting XI. In November 2015 he suffered an ankle ligaments injury in an FA Cup game.

On 13 February 2016 he made his 300th appearance for the club, scoring two goals in the process. On 23 April 2016 he scored a hat-trick as City beat promotion rivals Walsall 4–0; it was his first professional hat-trick, having previously not started a game since 5 March.

2016–17 season
After playing in the first two games of the 2016–17 season, Hanson missed over a month of play due to a calf problem. He scored his first goal of the season in a 3–2 victory against AFC Wimbledon on 29 October, scoring twice.

Sheffield United
On 21 January 2017 Sheffield United made an offer for Hanson. The transfer was completed on 24 January 2017. He stated that he was looking forward to playing against his old club. He scored on his debut in a 4–0 win over AFC Wimbledon on 4 February 2017. In August 2017 and November 2017 he was linked with a return to Bradford City, although the club's manager Stuart McCall dismissed the rumours.

Hanson made his debut in the Championship in November 2017, against Fulham.

He moved on loan to Bury in January 2018. He was transfer-listed by Sheffield United at the end of the 2017–18 season.

AFC Wimbledon
On 26 June 2018, Hanson left Sheffield United by mutual consent, and joined AFC Wimbledon.

Hanson struggled with minor injuries during the 2018–19 season. Wimbledon's last game of the season was away at Hanson's former club Bradford City.

In June 2019 he was linked with a possible return to Bradford City, but the link was denied by City manager Gary Bowyer.

Grimsby Town
In June 2019 he signed for Grimsby Town, on a two-year contract.

He scored 5 goals and made 3 assists in August 2019, which saw him awarded the EFL League Two Player of the Month for the month.

On 12 May 2021 it was announced that he would leave Grimsby at the end of the season, following the expiry of his contract.

Non-league
On 13 July 2021, Hanson signed with National League North side Farsley Celtic, having rejected interest from a number of League Two and National League clubs, to return to part-time football.

On 14 January 2022, Hanson signed for Boston United until end of the 2021–22 season. He was not retained at the end of the season.

On 12 June 2022, Hanson signed for Worksop Town ahead of the 2022–23 season.

Coaching career
Hanson began coaching at the RIASA Academy in September 2021.

Personal life
Hanson attended Beckfoot School in Bingley from 1999 to 2004. Hanson and his girlfriend Jodie had their first child, a daughter named Lexie, in November 2012. Lexie was blessed the day after her father scored in the League Two Playoff Final at Wembley. Jodie is a teacher who remained in the north when Hanson moved to London to play for Wimbledon.

Career statistics

Honours
Guiseley
Northern Premier League Chairman's Cup: 2006–07
Northern Premier League Challenge Cup: 2008–09

Bradford City
Football League Two play-offs: 2013
Football League Cup runner-up: 2012–13

Sheffield United
EFL League One: 2016–17

Individual
EFL League Two Player of the Month: August 2019.

References

External links

1987 births
Living people
Footballers from Bradford
English footballers
Association football forwards
Huddersfield Town A.F.C. players
Bradford City A.F.C. players
Eccleshill United F.C. players
Guiseley A.F.C. players
Sheffield United F.C. players
Bury F.C. players
AFC Wimbledon players
Grimsby Town F.C. players
Farsley Celtic F.C. players
Boston United F.C. players
Worksop Town F.C. players
Northern Premier League players
English Football League players
Association football coaches